I Don't Want to Go to Bed may refer to:
 I Don't Want to Go to Bed (album), a 1995 album by Cul de Sac
 I Don't Want to Go to Bed (book), a children's book by Astrid Lindgren